The Kingdom of Córdoba (also Kingdom of Cordova) was a territorial jurisdiction of the Crown of Castile since 1236 until Javier de Burgos' provincial division of Spain in 1833. This was a "kingdom" ("") in the second sense given by the : the Crown of Castile consisted of several such kingdoms. Córdoba was one of the Four Kingdoms of Andalusia.

Like the other kingdoms within Spain, the Kingdom of Córdoba was abolished by the 1833 territorial division of Spain.

See also

 Córdoba, Spain
 :es:Anexo:Localidades del Reino de Córdoba, a list of the localities that composed the Kingdom of Jaén, according to the Catastro of Ensenada (1750-54); this page is an appendix to the Spanish-language Wikipedia.

References

Kingdom of Cordoba
1833 disestablishments in Spain